"Goodbye and Good Luck" is the second single by Japanese rock band the Brilliant Green. It was released by Sony Music Records on December 1, 1997, and re-released by Defstar Records on October 1, 2000. This single was never released on a studio album. It peaked at #71 on the Oricon Singles Chart.

In 2008, the song was included on the band's compilation album Complete Single Collection '97–'08 and on the B-side of their single "Ash Like Snow".

Track listing

References

1997 singles
1997 songs
English-language Japanese songs
Songs written by Shunsaku Okuda
Songs written by Tomoko Kawase
The Brilliant Green songs